is a Japanese singer-songwriter, actor, and model. He was a member of Tokio, a Johnny & Associates musical group. He was the primary vocalist, in addition to playing the guitar alongside Tokio's leader, Shigeru Joshima.

Career

As an artist 
He was inspired by bands Hikaru Genji and SMAP to answer a recruiting call of Johnny & Associates and was accepted. In 1992, he played several stage plays (Playzone and Mask) together with other Tokio members. He first played tambourine during Tokio's early performances as SMAP's background dancers. Just prior to Tokio's debut, the band's rhythm guitarist, Hiromu Kojima, left the band and was replaced by Tomoya Nagase.

In 1997, Nagase collaborated with American R&B group 3T to record the Japanese version of Eternal Flame, which was used as the theme song for the Japanese drama D×D, in which he starred. The single was released under the artist name "Tomoya with 3T" and reached number 12 on the Oricon charts. Nagase lists Guns N' Roses as his favorite band.

In July 2020 it was announced that Nagase will be leaving Johnny & Associates in 2021.

As an actor 
Nagase has had parts in over 40 dramas. His first lead role was in Hakusen Nagashi (1996). More lead roles followed including Ikebukuro West Gate Park, Mukodono!, Unubore Deka, and Tiger & Dragon. Mukodono! was his first comedic role. In My Boss My Hero he had another comedic role. He received an "Ishihara Yuijiro Award" in 2002 as "The Best Newcomer" for his role in the movie Seoul.

Endorsements 
Nagase has endorsed many various brands with the band Tokio and by himself. He is currently a brand ambassador for Fujicolor and Lotte Toppo. With Tokio, he has endorsed among others Microsoft's Xbox 360 and Eneos, a brand for Nippon Oil. As an actor, he has also endorsed UFO Nissin noodles, Lotte Coolish drinks, Subaru, Morinaga, Suntory Dry beer, Mazda, All Nippon Airways, NTT docomo, Hitachi Wooo, and Uniqlo.

Filmography

Awards 
 The 3rd CONFiDENCE AWARD DRAMA PRIZE: Best Actor for "Fragile" (2016)
 45th Television Drama Academy Awards: Best Actor for "Tiger & Dragon" (2005)
 Nikkan Sports Film Awards: Ishihara Yujiro New Actor Award for "Seoul" (2002)
 29th Television Drama Academy Awards: Best Actor for "Mukodono!" (2001)
 107th Television Drama Academy Awards: Best Actor for "Ore no Ie no Hanashi" (2021)

References

External links 
 Tokio Official Website
 
 

1978 births
Living people
People from Yokohama
Japanese male film actors
Japanese male pop singers
Tokio (band) members
Musicians from Kanagawa Prefecture